Fabian Tait (born 10 February 1993) is an Italian professional footballer who plays as a midfielder for  club Südtirol.

Club career
Born in Salorno, Tait started his career in modest Eccellenza club ASV Salurn and Serie C2 club Mezzocorona.

In June 2014, he joined Serie C club Südtirol. On 13 September 2019, he extended his contract until 2023, at date he played 168 matches and 10 goals for the team, and he is also the second captain.

On 24 November 2019, he played his 200 match for the club.

References

External links
 
 

1993 births
Living people
Sportspeople from Bolzano
Footballers from Trentino-Alto Adige/Südtirol
Italian footballers
Association football midfielders
Serie B players
Serie C players
Serie D players
Eccellenza players
A.C. Mezzocorona players
F.C. Südtirol players